Theodor Dan (born 26 December 2000) is an English professional rugby union player, who currently plays as a hooker for Premiership Rugby side Saracens.

Early life 
Dan was born in London, England on Boxing Day 2000, to Romanian parents and grew up in Herne Hill. He began playing rugby at the age of five, firstly for Blackheath and subsequently for Old Alleynians. During his youth, he played as a centre and wing, before being recruited into the academy at Saracens as a teenager, and later studied at King's College London. He credits his grandfather Ion Dijmarescu, who played in the Romanian first division, for instilling his love of the sport.

Club career 
Dan joined the Saracens junior academy in 2017, aged 16, and was soon converted to hooker, although he is also capable of playing as a flanker. He described Saracens first-team hooker and British & Irish Lions international Jamie George as a key mentor. Dan represented the club in the Under-18 Academy League, before signing his first Saracens contract and graduating into the senior academy in June 2019. During his development, he spent time on loan at Bishop's Stortford in National League 1, the third tier of English rugby, playing under the tutelage of former Bath, Newcastle and Northampton player Andy Long.

In November 2021, Dan made his Saracens first-team debut in a victory over Harlequins in the pool stages of the 2021–22 Premiership Rugby Cup. He was dual-registered with Ampthill during the season and made several appearances for the club in the Championship, scoring one try. His Premiership debut for Saracens followed at the end of the 2021–22 Premiership regular season, against Gloucester. Subsequently, Dan was promoted into the Saracens first-team squad before the 2022–23 season.

International career 
Dan is qualified to represent both England and Romania. He has played for the England U18s, making his debut against France in March 2019. A year later, he scored two tries in four appearances for the England U20s during the abridged 2020 Six Nations.

References

2000 births
Living people
English rugby union players
Rugby union hookers
Saracens F.C. players